Jong Yee Khie (born 19 November 1988) is a Malaysian powerlifter. He won a silver medal for Malaysia in powerlifting in the men's -107 kg event at the 2020 Summer Paralympics in Tokyo.

Early and personal life
Jong hails from Batu Kawa, Kuching, Sarawak and worked as a hairdresser. He had his right leg amputated above the knee after being involved in a motorcycle accident in 2005. Jong was encouraged to take up the sport by his family during his recovery in 2008.

References

Paralympic powerlifters of Malaysia
Paralympic silver medalists for Malaysia
Living people
1988 births
Malaysian people of Chinese descent
People from Sarawak
Malaysian powerlifters
Medalists at the 2020 Summer Paralympics
Paralympic medalists in powerlifting
Powerlifters at the 2020 Summer Paralympics
Commonwealth Games silver medallists for Malaysia
Commonwealth Games bronze medallists for Malaysia
Commonwealth Games medallists in powerlifting
Powerlifters at the 2014 Commonwealth Games
Powerlifters at the 2018 Commonwealth Games
Commonwealth Games medallists in weightlifting
Medallists at the 2014 Commonwealth Games
Medallists at the 2018 Commonwealth Games